The 1976–77 BBC2 Floodlit Trophy was the twelfth occasion on which the BBC2 Floodlit Trophy competition had been held.

Castleford won the trophy by beating Leigh by the score of 12-4 (away from home on the opponent's own ground)
The match was played at Hilton Park, Leigh, now in the  Metropolitan Borough of Wigan, (historically in the county of Lancashire). The attendance was 5,402, and the  receipts were £2.793
Castleford had won the  first three BBC2 Floodlit Trophy finals, this brought the  wins up to four

Background 
This season saw no changes in the  entrants, no new members and no withdrawals, the number remaining at twenty-two.
The format remained as used in last season's tournament, i.e. as a knock-out competition from  the preliminary round through to the  final. 
The preliminary round involved twelve clubs, to reduce the numbers taking part in the  competition proper to just sixteen.

Competition and results

Preliminary round 
Involved  6 matches and 12 clubs

Round 1 – first round 
Involved  8 matches and 16 clubs

Round 2 – quarter finals 
Involved 4 matches with 8 clubs

Round 3 – semi-finals  
Involved 2 matches and 4 clubs

Final

Teams and scorers 

Scoring - Try = three points - Goal = two points - Drop goal = one point

The road to success 
This tree excludes any preliminary round fixtures

Notes and comments 
1 * Whitehaven, who joined the  competition in season 1973–74, play their first game at home in the competition - they also win their first game in the  competition
2 * This match was televised
3  * Hilton Park was the home ground of Leigh from 1947 to 2008.  The final capacity was in the region of 11,000, much less than the record attendance of 31,326, set in 1953 for a Challenge Cup match v  St. Helens

General information for those unfamiliar 
The Rugby League BBC2 Floodlit Trophy was a knock-out competition sponsored by the BBC and between rugby league clubs, entrance to which was conditional upon the club having floodlights. Most matches were played on an evening, and those of which the second half was televised, were played on a Tuesday evening.
Despite the competition being named as 'Floodlit', many matches took place during the afternoons and not under floodlights, and several of the entrants, including  Barrow and Bramley did not have adequate lighting. And, when in 1973, due to the world oil crisis, the government restricted the use of floodlights in sport, all the matches, including the Trophy final, had to be played in the afternoon rather than at night.
The Rugby League season always (until the onset of "Summer Rugby" in 1996) ran from around August-time through to around May-time and this competition always took place early in the season, in the Autumn, with the final taking place in December (The only exception to this was when disruption of the fixture list was caused by inclement weather)

See also 
1976–77 Northern Rugby Football League season
1976 Lancashire Cup
1976 Yorkshire Cup
BBC2 Floodlit Trophy
Rugby league county cups

References

External links
Saints Heritage Society
1896–97 Northern Rugby Football Union season at wigan.rlfans.com 
Hull&Proud Fixtures & Results 1896/1897
Widnes Vikings - One team, one passion Season In Review - 1896-97
The Northern Union at warringtonwolves.org
Huddersfield R L Heritage

BBC2 Floodlit Trophy
BBC2 Floodlit Trophy